Moran is a railway point on the BC Rail line north of Pavilion, British Columbia.  The location, which is high on the side of the stretch of the Fraser Canyon known as Moran Canyon, is notable as the site of the proposed Moran Dam, and due to the steep, sandy embankment and railway grade saw a fatal train wreck in 2006.

References

Lillooet Country